The Uwharrie Mountains are a mountain range in North Carolina spanning the counties of Randolph, Montgomery, Stanly, and Davidson. The range's foothills stretch into Cabarrus, Anson, Union, and Richmond counties.

The range's high point is High Rock Mountain ( as measured by the NC Geodetic Survey), in southwestern Davidson County.

The Uwharrie lie within the Southeastern mixed forests ecoregion. They give their name to the Uwharrie National Forest. Once entirely cleared for timber and farmland, the mountains were designated a U.S. National Forest in 1961 by President John F. Kennedy. The woodlands have since returned, providing a haven for a diversity of wildlife, recreational facilities, and numerous Native American archeological sites.

In 1799, the discovery of gold at the nearby Reed Gold Mine in Cabarrus County led to America's first gold rush.

The North Carolina Zoo, America's first state-supported zoo, is located in the Uwharries region.

The Caraway Mountains, a segment of the Uwharries, are located in western Randolph County, west of Asheboro.

Protected areas
 Birkhead Mountains Wilderness
 Morrow Mountain State Park
 Uwharrie National Forest

References

External links
 Uwharrie Forest page at UNC Asheville
 

Mountain ranges of North Carolina
Landforms of Randolph County, North Carolina
Landforms of Montgomery County, North Carolina
Landforms of Stanly County, North Carolina
Landforms of Davidson County, North Carolina